Winnie Madikizela-Mandela Local Municipality (formerly Mbizana Local Municipality) is a local municipality in Alfred Nzo District Municipality in the Wild Coast Region of the Eastern Cape Province in South Africa.

The name Mbizana means "little casserole" or "sauce pan" in isiXhosa.

It was formerly part of the OR Tambo District Municipality, but was transferred to the Alfred Nzo District Municipality after the 2011 municipal election.

Main places
The 2001 census divided the municipality into the following main places:

Politics 

The municipal council consists of sixty-four members elected by mixed-member proportional representation. Thirty-two councillors are elected by first-past-the-post voting in thirty-two wards, while the remaining thirty-two are chosen from party lists so that the total number of party representatives is proportional to the number of votes received. In the election of 1 November 2021 the African National Congress (ANC) won a majority of forty-eight seats on the council.
The following table shows the results of the election.

Births
Mbizana Local Municipality was the birthplace of:
 Oliver Tambo (1917–1993), born in the village of Nkantolo, South African anti-apartheid politician
 Winnie Madikizela-Mandela (1936-2018), born in the village of Mbhongweni, South African ANC Women's League leader
 Babalo Madikizela, born in the village of Mbhongweni, South African politician & MEC.

Logos

Touristic attractions
 Umtamvuna Nature Reserve
 Mbizana Nature Reserve
 OR Tambo Cultural Village
 OR Tambo Monument
Wild Coast Sun Resort
 Umtentu sanctuary

Fauna and flora
 Ficus bizanae is a Southern African indigenous tree.

References

External links

Local municipalities of the OR Tambo District Municipality